The Tampa Bay Rays are a professional baseball team based in St. Petersburg, Florida. They compete in the Eastern Division of Major League Baseball's (MLB) American League (AL). Tampa Bay first competed in Major League Baseball during the 1998 baseball season as the "Tampa Bay Devil Rays", an expansion team. Prior to the 2008 season, the team's name was officially shortened to "Rays". The list below documents players and teams that hold particular club records.

In twenty-five seasons from 1998 through the end of 2022, the team has an overall record of 1,912 wins and 2,034 losses for a winning percentage of 48.5%. The Rays have appeared in eight postseasons and won two American League pennants, in 2008 and 2020.

Note: To avoid confusion, this list is only updated at the end of each baseball season. Statistics below are through the end of the  season.

Individual career records
These are records of players with the best performance in particular statistical categories during their tenure with the Rays.

Career batting

Career pitching

Individual single-season records
These are records of Rays players with the best performance in particular statistical categories during a single season.

Single-season batting

Single-season pitching

Team season records
These are records of Rays teams with the best and worst performances in particular statistical categories during a single season.

Season batting

Season pitching

See also
 Baseball statistics
 Baseball awards
 List of MLB awards

Notes
Does not include abbreviated  season.

References

Records
Tampa Bay Rays